Wu is the name of several rivers. It may refer to:

In People's Republic of China
Wu River (Yangtze tributary), the largest Wu River, a tributary of the Yangtze
Wu River (Yuan River, north), a tributary and one of the headwaters of the Yuan River flowing through Guizhou and Hunan
Wu River (Yuan River, south), another tributary of the Yuan River in Hunan, joining the Yuan in Hongjiang downstream of the other Wu River
Wu River (Guangdong), a tributary of the Bei River flowing through Guangdong.
Jinhua River, a tributary of the Qiantang River in Zhejiang
The upper reach of the Le'an River in Jiangxi

In Republic of China (Taiwan) 
Dadu River (Taiwan), also called Wu River.